Aarne Väinö Edvard Honkavaara (June 7, 1924 – March 22, 2016) was a Finnish ice hockey player and coach. He was born in Tampere, Finland.

Playing career 
Honkavaara played his first game of ice hockey when he was 12 years old. The team which he represented was Tampereen Kisa-Veikot. He participated in the Continuation War between 1942–1944 and played his first actual SM-sarja game in 1944 against HSK. He played for Ilves, which was along with TBK, one of Tampere's top teams. He played his entire career for Ilves with the exception of a short visit to Canada, where he played in two Exhibition games for Sarnia Sailors. His playing career ended in 1953 when he broke his shin after a Polish player fell onto it during a National Team match between Finland and Poland. After retiring, he made a two-season return to playing staff while he was the head coach for Ilves in 1956. He re-retired in 1958 after a single game during his second season after comeback.

Coaching career
After retiring as a full-time player, Honkavaara went on to coach Ilves to three Finnish Championships (gold medal) and one silver medal (runner-up). He was also the National Team Coach of Finland between 1954 and 1959.

Museum founder
When the Finnish Hockey Hall of Fame was established June 14, 1979, Honkavaara was one of its founding members, and later served as its chairpersons from 1983 to 1996.

International career
Honkavaara was part of the Finnish national team and played 47 games for Finland, scoring 46 goals. He was also team captain of the national team during they'r first participation at the winter Olympics in 1952. 

International statistics

Career statistics

References

Bibliography
 Dynamo,  (Book in Finnish)

External links

1924 births
2016 deaths
Finland men's national ice hockey team coaches
Finnish ice hockey centres
Ice hockey players with retired numbers
Ilves players
Ice hockey people from Tampere
Ice hockey players at the 1952 Winter Olympics
Olympic ice hockey players of Finland